Robert Edward Townsend, Jr. (born September 13, 1943) is an American former competition swimmer, Pan American Games gold medalist, and former world record-holder.

Townsend won a gold medal as a member of the winning U.S. team in the men's 4×200-meter freestyle relay at the 1963 Pan American Games.  He participated in the 1964 Summer Olympics in Tokyo, where he swam for the gold medal-winning U.S. team in the preliminary heats of the men's 4×200-meter freestyle relay.  Under the 1964 Olympic swimming rules, he was ineligible for a medal, however, because he did not swim in the relay final.

Townsend attended Yale University, where he was a standout swimmer for coach Phil Moriarty's Yale Bulldogs swimming and diving team from 1963 to 1965.  He won an NCAA national championship in the 400-yard individual medley (1963), and three more as a member of winning Yale teams in the 400-yard freestyle relay (1963, 1964, 1965).

See also
 List of Yale University people
 World record progression 4 × 100 metres freestyle relay
 World record progression 4 × 200 metres freestyle relay

References

External links
 

1943 births
Living people
American male freestyle swimmers
World record setters in swimming
Olympic swimmers of the United States
Sportspeople from Santa Clara, California
Swimmers at the 1963 Pan American Games
Swimmers at the 1964 Summer Olympics
Yale Bulldogs men's swimmers
Pan American Games gold medalists for the United States
Pan American Games medalists in swimming
Medalists at the 1963 Pan American Games